Pankaj Shaw (born 12 February 1988) is an Indian cricketer who played for Bengal. He played in twelve first-class, seven List A and sixteen Twenty20 matches between 2014 and 2017. In December 2016, Shaw scored 413 not out in a Cricket Association of Bengal First Division match.

References

External links
 

1988 births
Living people
Indian cricketers
Bengal cricketers
People from Nadia district